Mohammad Javed (born 4 May 1969 in Karachi, Pakistan), also known as Mohammad Jawed, is a former Pakistani cricketer.

He played as a right-handed batsman and right-arm medium pace bowler, and appeared in over 100 matches in both first-class and List A cricket for various teams in Pakistan. Despite reaching the highest level of Pakistani domestic cricket, he never represented them in Tests or One Day Internationals, although he did represent them in two matches in the cricket tournament at the 1998 Commonwealth Games.

References

External links 
Cricket Archive profile
Cricinfo profile
Wisden profile

1969 births
Living people
Pakistani cricketers
Cricketers at the 1998 Commonwealth Games
Karachi cricketers
Karachi Blues cricketers
Pakistan National Shipping Corporation cricketers
National Bank of Pakistan cricketers
Karachi Whites cricketers
Cricketers from Karachi
Commonwealth Games competitors for Pakistan